The Ghermezian family is a Canadian business family of Iranian Jewish origin. The Ghermezians are best known for building North America's three largest shopping malls: West Edmonton Mall, Mall of America, and American Dream. The family has been based in Edmonton since 1964.

History 
The Ghermezian family originates from Iran, where they dealt in rugs for several generations. In 1895, Elijah Ghermezian founded the family business. Sometime before World War II, the family moved to Tehran.

Jacob Ghermezian (1902 – 3 January 2000), was born and grew up in Iran. He became one of the wealthiest businessmen in the country, and during 1943, he hosted U.S. President Franklin Roosevelt, U.K. Prime Minister Winston Churchill, and Soviet leader Joseph Stalin in his apartment during the critical Tehran Conference, where the three world leaders discussed the final stages of World War II and planned their path to victory. In the early 1950s, Jacob moved his family to Montreal where he opened Ghermezian Bros. on Sherbrooke Street. By the mid 1960s, the business included 16 stores across North America, and was the largest importer of oriental rugs to the United States.

In 1964, the family moved west and settled in Edmonton, hoping to capitalise on the province's booming oil economy. In 1967, they incorporated as Ghermez Developments Ltd., which in 1973 became Triple Five Corp. Ltd. The family acquired vast quantities of farm land surrounding Edmonton in the hope of finding oil, but their search proved unsuccessful. However, in the 1970s the province set out to build a green belt around Edmonton. Through this project, the Ghermezians made a fortune selling farm land to the government. The four sons, Eskandar, Nader, Raphael and Bahman, grew the family rug business into a large real estate and construction company.

Estate
The family's estates include the West Edmonton Mall in Edmonton, Alberta, and the Mall of America in Bloomington, Minnesota, along with many other businesses. In 2011, the family's Triple Five Group acquired the troubled Xanadu Meadowlands project in New Jersey, which they renamed to American Dream. The mall opened on October 25, 2019. However, due to the COVID-19 pandemic, mall attendance has been low and due the leveraged position, it may lead to secured creditors taking up to 49% of the equity in their other mega-malls.

Family members 

 Elijah Ghermezian
 Yacoub (Jacob) Moshe Ghermezian (1902 – 2000), m. Nenehjan (Myriam)
 Eskandar Ghermezian
 David Ghermezian
 Don Ghermezian
 Syd Ghermezian
 Raphael Ghermezian
 Leonardo (Leo) Ghermezian
 Nader Ghermezian
 Bahman Ghermezian
 Mark Ghermezian
 Bobby (Bobby Boy) Ghermezian
 Paul Ghermezian

References

Ghermezian
Iranian billionaires
Iranian Jews
Ghermezian
Iranian emigrants to Canada
Businesspeople from Edmonton
Canadian people of Iranian-Jewish descent
Ghermezian
Jewish-Canadian families